Kallu Sakkare (Kannada: ಕಲ್ಲುಸಕ್ಕರೆ) is a 1967 Indian Kannada film, directed and produced by Kalyan Kumar. The film stars Kalyan Kumar, Jayanthi, Jr. Revathi and B. Vijayalakshmi in the lead roles. The film has musical score by N. S. Thyagarajan.

Cast
Kalyan Kumar
Jayanthi
Jr. Revathi
B. Vijayalakshmi
K. S. Ashwath

References

External links
 

1967 films
1960s Kannada-language films